The 2000 Libertarian National Convention was held in Anaheim, California, from June 30 to July 4, 2000. Harry Browne was again chosen as the party's presidential nominee, becoming the first Libertarian Party candidate to be nominated twice for president.

The theme of the 2000 convention was "America's Future: Liberty, Responsibility, & Community."

The Libertarians hold a National Convention every two years to vote on party bylaws, platform and resolutions and elect national party officers and a judicial committee. Every four years it nominates presidential and vice presidential candidates.

Speakers

Those who attended include:
 Harry Browne
 Barry Hess, Director of the Hess Foundation Trust
 Don Gorman
 Dave Hollist
 Jacob Hornberger
 Gary Nolan, syndicated talk radio host
 Russell Means, Indian Rights advocate
 Jack Gargan, former Reform Party National Chairman
 Carla Howell, Massachusetts candidate for U.S. Senate
 Neal Boortz, national syndicated radio talk show host
 David Nolan, Libertarian Party founder
 Michael Cloud, U.S. House Candidate
 David Bergland, then-Libertarian Party National Chair
 Dean Ahmad
 Barbara Howe, Libertarian candidate for Governor of North Carolina
 Michael Tanner of the Cato Institute
 Mark Skousen
 David Thibodeau, author of A Place Called Waco: A Survivor's Story

Voting for presidential nomination

First ballot
Harry Browne was elected on the first ballot, gathering a majority of the voting delegates and securing the nomination.

Voting for vice presidential nomination
A separate vote was held for the vice presidential nomination.  Former Bellflower, California Mayor, Art Olivier was nominated on the second ballot.

First ballot
After the first round, the rules were suspended, and a motion carried to only allow the top two candidates to appear on the second ballot.

Second ballot
Art Oliver defeated Steve Kubby on the second ballot, securing the Libertarian Party nomination for Vice President.

See also
 Libertarian National Convention
 Other parties' presidential nominating conventions of 2000:
 Green
 Democratic
 Republican
 Libertarian Party of Colorado
 U.S. presidential election, 2000

References

External links
 2000 Libertarian Presidential Campaign Platform
 2000 Libertarian Convention

Libertarian Party (United States) National Conventions
2000 United States presidential election
Libertarian National Convention
20th century in Anaheim, California
Political conventions in California
2000 conferences
Libertarian National Convention
Libertarian National Convention
Events in Anaheim, California